Likhobory is a station on the Moscow Central Circle of the Moscow Metro that opened in September 2016.

Name
Likhobory station shares its name with a station on the Little Ring railway line and Verkhniye Likhobory, a station on the Lyublinsko-Dmitrovskaya Line. The name is derived from an area north of Moscow along the Likhoborka River. The station's name during construction was Nikolaevskaya, but was changed by the city prior to the opening of the line.

References

External links 

 Лихоборы mkzd.ru

Moscow Metro stations
Railway stations in Russia opened in 2016
Moscow Central Circle stations